Ann Pfau is an American jurist and former Chief Administrative Judge of the State of New York.

Early life and education
She graduated from Wells College in 1970. She later received an MA from Columbia University in 1973 and a JD from the Brooklyn Law School in 1984.

Legal career
Pfau began her legal career in Counsel's Office of the Office of Court Administration. She was appointed in 1997 as an Interim Judge of the New York City Civil Court and in 1998 as a Judge of the New York City Criminal Court. She currently is an Acting Supreme Court Justice in the Second Judicial District.

Judge Pfau served as First Deputy Chief Administrative Judge of New York until her appointment as Chief Administrative Judge and prior to that was the Administrative Judge of the Supreme Court, Second Judicial District.

Tenure as Chief Administrative Judge
She was appointed Chief Administrative Judge of all New York State courts in 2007 following and appointment by former Chief Judge Judith S. Kaye. As the Chief Administrative Judge, Pfau oversaw the administration and operation of the Statewide court system with a $2.53 billion budget, 3,600 State and locally paid Judges and over 15,200 nonjudicial employees in over 300 locations around the State.

She will step down on Dec. 1, 2011 to take over a new medical malpractice program and try cases in her home borough of Brooklyn.

In 2012, Pfau was honored with the Stanley H. Fuld Award, given by the Commercial and Federal Litigation Section of the New York State Bar Association.

References

New York (state) lawyers
American jurists
Wells College alumni
Brooklyn Law School alumni
Living people
American women judges
Year of birth missing (living people)
21st-century American women